This is a partial list of Ayatollahs, a title given to high ranked Twelver Usuli Shi'a Muslim clerics. Its ranking is higher than Hujjat al-Islam, and the next higher clerical rank is Grand Ayatollah also known as Marja'. This list contains only the names of Ayatollahs. To see the list of Grand Ayatollahs, or Hujjatul Islams, see the following articles: List of Maraji; List of Hujjatul Islams.

Current
The names are ordered with age in descending order. (oldest to youngest).

Deceased
The names are ordered by date of death (descending) as an arbitrary standard.

 India Al-Allamah, Al-Faqeeh, Al-Adeeb Ayatollah Shaikh Ali Hazeen Lahiji (17th century)
 India Ayatollah Aga Syed Mehdi Kashmiri (d.1892)
 India Ayat-ul-Ilm-e-wat-Tuqa Ayatullah Syed Imdad Ali – First Ameed Jamia-e-Imania, Banaras 
 India Jawad-ul-Ulama Ayatollah Syed Ali Jawad Al-Husaini, Zangipur/Banaras (1857-1920) – Mu'aasir wa Ham-Jama'at Sahib-e-Abaqaat
 India Munaitiq-e-Zaman Ayatullah Syed Mohammad Sajjad Al-Husaini – Founder Jamia Jawadia, Banaras (1928) 
 India Qudwat-ul-Fuqaha Ayatullah Syed Sibte Husain, Jaunpur 
 India Ayatollah Syed Ali Shah Rizvi Kashmiri 
 India Alam-ul-Aalaam Ayatullah Syed Muzaffar Husain Al-Husaini – First Haadi (Supreme Authority) Jamia Jawadia, Banaras (d.1944)
 India Ayatollah Syed Mohammad Abul Hasan Rizvi Kashmiri – Founder of Sultanul Madaris son of Ayatollah Syed Ali Shah Rizvi Kashmiri 
 India Ayatollah Syed Mohammad Mosawi Ichgami Kashmiri (1910 - 1959)
 Saudi Arabia Ayatollah Sheikh Muhammad Ali al-Amri

See also 

 List of current Maraji
 List of deceased Maraji
 List of Hujjatul Islams

References

External links

Further reading

 The book "Durr-e-Mansoor dar Halaat-e-Ulama-e-Zangipur"
 The research work of Dr. Inayet Ali on "life of Jawad-ul-Ulama" from Aligarh Muslim University.
 The booklet "Haqnuma" published Jamia-Imania,Banaras.

Ayatollah
 
 List of Ayatollahs